The Futures Collegiate Baseball League (FCBL) is an eight-team collegiate summer baseball league. It has four franchises in Massachusetts, two in Connecticut, and one each in New Hampshire and Vermont.

Format
The Futures League is a wood-bat league. Its regular season schedule calls for 68 games per team as of 2021 (34 home and 34 away games).

FCBL ballplayers are unpaid collegiate athletes who join the league to gain experience and exposure to Major League Baseball scouts. The FCBL mission is to prepare young men for the rigors of playing professional baseball.

Unique rules
The league accepts players who were on college baseball rosters during the preceding spring season, as well as players who have signed a commitment to play college baseball in the upcoming school year. In 2018, teams were allowed to carry up to five "commits". At least 15 of the 30 players on a roster must have a local connection, either residing in New England or affiliated with a college in New England.

Since 2017, regular-season games that are tied after regulation and remain tied after one extra inning have been decided by a home-run hitting contest that may take three rounds.

History
The Futures League was co-developed by:
Drew Weber, who owned the Single A Lowell Spinners and developed and owned the Double A New Hampshire Fisher Cats, and
Chris Carminucci, whose Carminucci Sports Group operated the Brockton Rox of the independent Can-Am League.

The Carminucci Sports Group sought to place an NECBL franchise on the island of Martha's Vineyard, and the Spinners hoped to do the same in Nashua, New Hampshire. The NECBL declined to expand, so the organizations formed a separate league. The FCBL aimed to use professional baseball operators with proven histories. Most FCBL venues are former professional ballparks (marked with an asterisk in the table below).

2011 season
The league started play in the 2011 season. Martha's Vineyard, Nashua, Seacoast, and Torrington were the charter franchises. The championship paired the top two franchises in a best-of-three series. Nashua (27–16) won the regular season and defeated Torrington (25–17) for the championship.

2012 season
For the 2012 season, the FCBL expanded from four to nine teams. The league expanded into the Leominster/Fitchburg, Massachusetts area with the addition of the Wachusett Dirt Dawgs. In addition, the FCBL induced the North Shore and Old Orchard Beach franchises to jump from the NECBL, as well as the Pittsfield and Brockton franchises of the professional, independent Can-Am League to convert to the collegiate format. The Pittsfield franchise was acquired by majority owner Marvin Goldklang and the Goldklang Group, which owns and operates four other minor-league baseball teams.

An all-star game was played, pitting selected players from the four charter teams against the five new teams.

The post-season was also revamped to involve four of the nine teams. The winners of two best-of-three division series (#4 plays #1, #3 plays #2) competed in a best-of-three championship series. Nashua repeated as FCBL Champion.

2013 season
The 2013 season was played with the same nine franchises as in 2012. The playoffs were expanded to include the top six teams of the nine. The teams finishing first and second got a first-round bye, with the remaining playoff teams to play a new initial round consisting of a single game.

Earlier, a league press release had mentioned that "The FCBL is planning and negotiating with other locations for further expansion in the 2013 season." Speculation had centered on Worcester, Massachusetts, where the Worcester Tornadoes had lost its affiliation with the Can-Am League. A Tornadoes creditor, John Creedon Jr., was in discussions with the College of the Holy Cross to secure a lease for Hanover Insurance Park at Fitton Field.

The all-star game was structured as Massachusetts versus "New England" (the four non-Massachusetts teams).

The regular season was extended by two days (to August 9 and 10) in view of the season's many rain-outs. The games scheduled for these days sometimes were not against opponents that were due to complete a rained-out game. The one-game play-in games occurred on the afternoon of August 11—not at the site of the higher-seeded team, but at the site of the winner's opponent in the next round, which began the same evening. This next round, a best-of-three series, was slated for alternating sites, though in neither case was the third game necessary. The final round reverted to the prior year's rule, in which the higher-seeded team (in this case, Martha's Vineyard) had the option of hosting the first game or any remaining games. Martha's Vineyard elected to open the series in Nashua, on August 14, and won the series at home the next day.

2014 season
For the 2014 season the league split into an East and West division of five teams each. The All-Star Game assembled teams comprising the best players of each division; on July 24, the West beat the East, 4–1. The regular season expanded to 56 games, with each team playing 28 home games and 28 road games. No team actually played 56 games, as rain-outs occurring late in the season were not made up. The 2014 FCBL playoffs were conducted as in 2013, except that the rules gave the winner of each division the bye in round one, and guaranteed that, of the next four teams with the best overall records, the higher-seeded team would host the one-game play-in.

On September 20, 2013, John Creedon Jr., who prior to the 2013 season had discussed bringing baseball back to the city of Worcester, announced that he would indeed operate the league's tenth franchise at Hanover Insurance Park at Fitton Field starting in 2014, and unveiled the Bravehearts on December 2, 2013.

The two division winners, Worcester (West) and Martha's Vineyard (East), won their semifinal series and met in the best-of-three final series. Worcester swept the series to become the 2014 champions.

2015 season
For 2015, the Old Orchard Beach franchise was replaced by the Bristol Blues. The Nashua franchise was moved from the West Division to the East Division to maintain both divisions at five teams. The playoffs were further expanded to include eight of the ten teams in post-season play. The first two playoff rounds consisted of a single elimination game, in two days reducing the playoff field from eight teams to two. The East was the stronger division; the new Bristol team (33–23), which won the West Division, had a worse record than three of the teams in the East. Bristol faced the Worcester Bravehearts (26–30) in the final series; last year's champion had flirted with elimination for much of the season, but came on strong in the final weeks of the regular season to finish second in the West. The higher-seeded Bristol elected that the series begin in Worcester, where Worcester won. In the games played at Bristol, Bristol won Game 2, but Worcester won the deciding game, on August 16, to repeat as FCBL champions.

2016 season
In November 2015, the league announced that the playoff format would revert to that of 2014, with six of ten teams making the post-season. The Seacoast Mavericks had the first winning season in its six-year history, but lost the semifinal series to Nashua in three games. Worcester returned to the finals, but Nashua won that series, defeating Worcester first at home and then in Worcester.

A visit by Bristol to North Shore on July 27 was suspended at 7 minutes after midnight, tied 4-4 after 17 innings. It was completed on August 4, North Shore scoring the winning run on a sacrifice fly in the 21st inning. The game was the longest FCBL game ever, taking a total of 6:04 to play. It disrupted the scheduling of both pitching staffs and led the league to announce a rules change the next year.

2017 season
On December 20, 2016, the Futures League published a 2017 schedule for a nine-team league not including the Titans. The following month, the league announced a point system, similar to that used by the National Hockey League (NHL), to decide playoff seedings. For games decided without the need for a Home Run Derby (see below), the winning team would receive two points. For games requiring a Home Run Derby, both teams would receive one point, with a team winning a derby receiving an additional point. Near the end of the regular season, the league clarified that the basis for seeding teams in the playoffs would actually be "point percentage": the ratio of actual points to potential points (total potential points being twice the number of games played). The clarification was necessary because the clubs had had different numbers of games cancelled by bad weather. The interpretation eventually helped Worcester qualify for the post-season at the expense of Martha's Vineyard.

All six games of the play-in and semifinal rounds were won by the lower-seeded team. This set up a final series between fifth-seeded Nashua and sixth-seeded Worcester, a repeat of the 2016 finals. Defending champion Nashua Silver Knights won one game away and at home against the Worcester Bravehearts to repeat as champions.

Introduction of the Home Run Derby
On January 27, 2017, the league announced that regular-season games tied after 10 innings would be decided by a home-run hitting contest. The league stated that the purpose of this rule was to protect pitchers' arms and encourage college coaches to recommend the league to their pitchers.

The first use of the Home Run Derby was June 7, when the visiting Martha's Vineyard Sharks tied the Wachusett Dirt Dawgs, 13–13, after 10 innings. In the first (three-minute) round of the Home Run Derby, the Sharks hit a total of 5 home runs out of Doyle Field, using both their time-outs to substitute batters at each one-minute interval. The Dirt Dawgs used Zack Tower, who had not played in the regulation game. He hit 5 home runs in 70 seconds, at which point the Dirt Dawgs used their first time-out. Tower remained at bat and hit the deciding home run shortly after.

In the 238 games played in the 2017 regular season, a total of 10 used the Home Run Derby. There were no tie games. In 7-inning games of doubleheaders, the Home Run Derby was used if the teams were tied after 8 innings.

2018 season
After the 2017 season, the Seacoast Mavericks declined to remain at Leary Field in Portsmouth, New Hampshire, in 2018 as it envisioned a sports complex in Dover, New Hampshire. The Wachusett Dirt Dawgs said that the city commission controlling the grounds declined to renew the operating agreement as "(The DPW) felt we weren't cleaning up after ourselves as well as we should". Both clubs paid their 2018 dues, anticipating a return to the league in 2019.

The league allowed teams to carry up to 5 "commits" (high-school graduates intending to play college baseball in the coming year). The league retained the Home Run Derby, but dropped the provision for tie games and standings based on a point system. The league also kept the 2017 format in which the top 6 teams made the playoffs (the lower-seeded four entering a one-game play-in), though this was now 6-of-7 rather than 6-of-9. In each three-game playoff series, the higher-seeded team was no longer given an option but was scheduled to host Game 1, and Game 3 if necessary.

A scoreless tie between Bristol and Nashua on June 7 was settled with the first Home Run Derby that had ever gone past the first (three-minute) round into the second (two-minute) round. Bristol's Connor Nolan hit three home runs in each round to out-hit Nashua, 6–5, and to give Bristol the victory by an official score of 1–0. Two other Derbies were tied after one round and went to the second round.

In the playoffs, top-seeded Martha's Vineyard and Worcester eventually became the finalists. When a weather-delayed final series resulted in a deciding Game 3 on Martha's Vineyard on August 13, which was called after being tied 1–1 in the first inning, Martha's Vineyard and Worcester were declared co-champions.

2019 season
In the 2018 off-season, Commissioner Chris Hall announced his resignation. The league selected Joe Paolucci to replace him. The FCBL announced a new ownership group in Westfield, Massachusetts, but the move was countered as the Martha's Vineyard Sharks switched to the NECBL. The Futures League claimed this move would require either a two-thirds "hardship" vote of other franchises or payment of an exit fee, and sued to block the switch. The Sharks countersued, saying the league bylaws were never signed. The conflict delayed into 2019 the release of schedules by both leagues. On January 19, the NECBL announced the Sharks' entry into that league (replacing a team that folded and maintaining the NECBL at 13 teams). The FCBL announced its schedule on January 24, again with 7 franchises, 6 of them qualifying for the playoffs. On February 20, the league announced that the new seventh team would be called the Westfield Starfires.

John Creedon Jr., the owner of the Worcester Bravehearts, bought the Nashua Silver Knights from Drew Weber and from the others to which Weber had sold a minority interest.

The Westfield franchise trailed the other six during the regular season, suggesting its elimination from the playoffs—sometimes losing so many games as to give all six other franchises a .500 winning average or better. This was the case at the end of the regular season, Westfield finishing at 15–41. The other teams had relative parity, and first place changed hands frequently. Brockton and Bristol avoided the play-in round, but Worcester survived that round, won the semifinal series against Brockton, and swept the final series against Bristol to win the title.

The rules for locating the semifinal series apparently were changed via conference call to give the lower-seeded club the right to host the second game, but were changed back for the finals to give the higher-seeded club the choice of hosting the first game or all remaining games. In addition, Worcester's semifinal series was delayed for one day based on its lack of access to Fitton Field on August 7.

2020 season
Changes for 2020 were announced on October 28, 2019. The Bristol Blues left the FCBL and joined the NECBL. The New Britain Bees, which formerly played in the Atlantic League, took the Blues' place as the seventh team. The 2020 season was to be played in two halves, with the first-half champion, second-half champion, and the two teams with next best won-lost records overall, advancing to the playoffs. The Home Run Derby to break ties continued for a fourth year, but lasting only a single, three-minute round.

Additional changes were forced by the COVID-19 pandemic. The NECBL and the Cape Cod League did not play at all, and the start of the FCBL's 2020 season was delayed. On June 22, the league announced a 39-game schedule to be played by six teams, without the Pittsfield Suns. Teams would play as a single division with a single, best-of-3 playoff series between the top two teams.

Based on "reopening guidelines" of the governors of Connecticut, Massachusetts, and New Hampshire, the league played an unbalanced schedule continuing further into August than ever before. Opening Day was July 2 in Connecticut and New Hampshire and July 7 for the four Massachusetts clubs. Mondays were league-wide off days but were available to make up games that had been rained out.

The playoffs were August 20 through 22, between the Worcester Bravehearts (23-15) and the Nashua Silver Knights (23-16). Worcester had played its home games at Doyle Field in Leominster, but the entire final series was played at Nashua, Worcester playing as the home team in games 1 and 3 due to its higher seed. Worcester won the first game but lost the second and third games, giving Nashua its fifth championship.

2021 season
For 2021, the Futures League added the Vermont Lake Monsters in Burlington, Vermont, formerly of the Class A Short Season New York-Penn League. Chris English, the owner of the Brockton Rox, is the leader of the Lake Monsters' ownership group. The North Shore Navigators returned to the New England Collegiate Baseball League for 2021. The Norwich Sea Unicorns, also from the defunct New York-Penn League, joined the Futures League in 2021, bringing the league back up to eight teams. Vermont would go on to win the 2021 Futures League Championship Series.

2022 season
In 2022, the Futures League remained at eight teams. For the third consecutive year, select Futures League games were broadcast on regional cable sports channel NESN. The Brockton Rox hosted five sons of former Major League players, including the sons of Boston Red Sox legends David Ortiz, Pedro Martinez, and Manny Ramirez.

The 2022 season saw the Vermont Lake Monsters win the regular season title for the second year in a row. New Britain, Nashua, and Westfield rounded out the four-team playoff field. The Nashua Silver Knights defeated the Vermont Lake Monsters in three games to win their sixth Futures League championship.
Nashua would lose the first game at Centennial Field by a score of 12-0, but rebounded to win Game 2 at Holman Stadium, 6-5 on a walk-off, and the deciding Game 3 in Burlington, 6-5.

League officers
Joe Paolucci is the commissioner of the FCBL, succeeding Chris Hall, who served from 2011 through 2018. John Creedon, Jr., the owner of the Worcester Bravehearts and Nashua Silver Knights, is chairman of the league's board of directors.

Teams

 * Former professional baseball team
 ^ Former professional baseball venue

League champions
2011: Nashua Silver Knights
2012: Nashua Silver Knights
2013: Martha's Vineyard Sharks
2014: Worcester Bravehearts
2015: Worcester Bravehearts
2016: Nashua Silver Knights
2017: Nashua Silver Knights
2018: Worcester Bravehearts and Martha's Vineyard Sharks declared co-champions
2019: Worcester Bravehearts
2020: Nashua Silver Knights
2021: Vermont Lake Monsters
2022: Nashua Silver Knights

Single season records

Career records

References

External links
Official homepage

 
2010 establishments in the United States
Sports leagues established in 2010